Heritage is a neighborhood located in Greenville, South Carolina. Located northwest of the city, it is home to the St. George Greek Orthodox Church and was once home to a dairy.

The neighborhood was subdivided in 1909 and experienced peak construction during the 1920s.

References
Greenville, South Carolina historic districts, including Heritage. - accessed 27 June 2010.

Neighborhoods in Greenville, South Carolina